Robin redbreast may refer to:

 American robin, Turdus migratories, in the Turdidae (true thrush) family
 Flame robin, Petroica phoenicea
 Red-capped robin, Petroica goodenovii
 Scarlet robin, Petroica multicolor
 European robin, Erithacus rubecula, a small passerine bird in the Muscicapidae (Old World flycatchers) family
 Robin Redbreast (TV play), a 1970 BBC Play for Today